Kandeh Sureh may refer to:
 Kandeh Sureh, Baneh
 Kandeh Sureh, Saqqez